Pyār (Punjabi: ਪਿਆਰ pi'āra) is the Punjabi and Hindi word for love. It is derived from Sanskrit priya (love) and kāra (act). It is one of the five virtues of Sikhism.

See also 
 Five Virtues

References

Sikh terminology